Marília Rocha (born 1978) is a Brazilian filmmaker whose work has focused in the potentialities of documentary film. Her works have been included in the festivals and special screenings of MoMA – Museum of Modern Art (USA), It's All True (Brazil), Rotterdam IFF (Netherlands), Bafici (Argentina), Guadalajara IFF (Mexico), Doclisboa (Portugal), among others. Since 2003 she is a member of Teia, along with Clarissa Campolina, Helvécio Marins Jr., Leonardo Barcelos, Pablo Lobato and Sérgio Borges. The group founded a center for audiovisual production and research where they work collaboratively, combining the individual production with projects that involve the whole team and invited professionals.

Filmography
 Where I Grow Old (2016)
 A Falta que me Faz / Like Water Through Stone (2009)
 Acácio (2008)
 Aboio / Cattle Callers (2005)

Awards 
Cattle Callers
 Best film 10th It's All True – International Documentary Festival (Brazil);
 Best sound track and best sound 9th CinePE (Brazil);
 Best film 10th Rio de Janeiro International Ethnographic Film Festival (Brazil).

Screenings 
Like Water Through Stone
 39th Film Festival Rotterdam (Netherlands)
 42nd Brasília Festival of Brazilian Film (Brazil)
 13th Tiradentes Film Festival (Brazil)
Acacio
 38th International Film Festival Rotterdam (Netherlands)
 11th BAFICI - Buenos Aires Independent Film Festival (Argentina)
 DocLisboa 2009 (Portugal)
 24th Guadalajara International Film Festival (Mexico)
 10th International Film Festival of Las Palmas de Gran Canaria (Spain)
 32nd São Paulo International Film Festival (Brazil)
 SANFIC5 -Santiago International Festival (Chile)
 13th Lima International Festival (Peru)
 31st Havana Film Festival (Cuba)
 12th Tiradentes Film Festival (Brazil)
 forumdoc.bh.2008 - International Documentary Festival (Brazil)
 I Semana dos Realizadores (Brazil)
Cattle Callers
 MoMA - The Museum of Modern Art (USA)
 21st Guadalajara International Film Festival (Mexico)
 41st Karlovy Vary International Film Festival (Czech Republic)
 9th Rencontres internationales du documentaire de Montréal (Canada)
 7th Tempo Documentary Festival (Sweden)
 10th It's All True – International Documentary Festival (Brazil)
 Rio International Festival (Brazil)
 9th CinePE (Brazil)
 FICA – International Festival of Environmental Film and Video (Brazil)
 10th Rio de Janeiro International Ethnographic Film Festival (Brazil)
 10th FAM - Florianópolis Audiovisual Mercosul (Brazil)
 Indie2005 - World Film Festival (Brazil)
 9th Tiradentes Film Festival (Brazil)
 Les Écrans Documentaires (France)
 Rencontres Internationales Paris/Berlin (France)

References

External links
 Official website mariliarocha.com
 Marilia Rocha's Vimeo channel
 Teia Films
 Cinelatinoamericano.org
 Revista Cinética - A Falta que me Faz
 Revista Cinética - Aboio

1978 births
Brazilian artists
Brazilian contemporary artists
Living people
Brazilian film directors
Place of birth missing (living people)